Saint Brendan's Irish Cream Liqueur is a cream liqueur named after Saint Brendan. It is made in Derry, Northern Ireland, using locally made The Quiet Man Irish whiskey and fresh cream.

In the 2016 US market, Saint Brendan's ranked fifth in the cream liqueur category, behind Baileys Irish Cream, RumChata, Carolans, and E.&J. Cask & Cream.

The product is imported to the United States by Luxco.

References

Product owner's website

External links
Official website

Cream liqueurs
Economy of Derry (city)